The 1954 New Year Honours in New Zealand were appointments by Elizabeth II on the advice of the New Zealand government to various orders and honours to reward and highlight good works by New Zealanders. The awards celebrated the passing of 1953 and the beginning of 1954, and were announced on 1 January 1954.

The recipients of honours are displayed here as they were styled before their new honour.

Knight Bachelor
 John Moody Albert Ilott – of Wellington. For public and philanthropic services.

Order of Saint Michael and Saint George

Knight Commander (KCMG)
 The Honourable Harold Eric Barrowclough  – Chief Justice.

Companion (CMG)
 George Edwin Lisle Alderton – high commissioner for New Zealand in the Commonwealth of Australia.
 Guy Richardson Powles – high commissioner of Western Samoa.

Order of the British Empire

Commander (CBE)
Civil division
 Thomas Abram Barrow  – lately Air Secretary.
 George Lyttelton Laurenson – Commissioner of Transport.
 The Right Reverend Wiremu Netana Panapa – Bishop of Aotearoa.
 William Riddet – professor of agriculture at Massey Agricultural College, Palmerston North.

Military division
 Brigadier James Russell Page  – New Zealand Army.

Officer (OBE)
Civil division
 William Arthur Anderson  – of Queenstown. For services to the community.
 Marjorie Fulton Barnett – deputy director of the nursing division, Health Department.
 John Blacklock Carruthers – of Eketāhuna. For services to local government.
 Harold Fisher Guy – mayor of Kaikohe. For services to education and local government.
 Walter Alexander Lee – president of the New Zealand Counties Association.
 Wallace George Lowe – of Hastings; a member of the Mount Everest Expedition, 1953.
 Norman Harold Moss – mayor of Stratford.
 The Honourable William James Rogers – formerly a member of the Legislative Council, mayor of Wanganui.
 John Brown Sim  – of Pukekohe. For services to education.
 William Alfred Stevenson – of Auckland. For services to the community.

Military division
 The Reverend Henry Gordon Taylor  – chaplain, Royal New Zealand Navy.
 Lieutenant-Colonel Edgar William Aked  – New Zealand Territorial Force.
 Wing Commander Stanley Gilbert Quill  – Royal New Zealand Air Force.

Member (MBE)
Civil division
 Carrie Sarah McDiarmid Adnams – of Auckland. For social welfare services.
 George Frederick Allen – of Christchurch. For services to the community.
 Walter Edward Barber – of Foxton. For services to the community.
 Catherine Jane Campbell – matron of the Presbyterian children's home, Timaru
 John Corder  – of Nelson. For services to local government.
 Lily Ann Donohue – of Christchurch. For services to nursing.
 Helen May Hunter – of Waipukurau. For services in the interests of returned servicemen.
 Ellen Isabella Maider – of Dunedin. For social welfare services.
 The Reverend Wharetini Rangi – a Church of England minister, of Ruatoki North, Bay of Plenty. For services to the Māori people.
 Walter George Rutherford – secretary of the Palmerston North branch of the Returned Soldiers' Association.
 Donald William Rutledge  – of Auckland. For services to the community.
 Norma Leonie Shelton – of Gisborne. For social welfare services.
 Kenneth George Leslie Smith – conductor of the New Zealand National Band during its 1953 tour overseas.
 Walter Frederick Sturman – of Invercargill. For services to local government.
 Mairatea Tahiwi – vice-president of the Māori Women's Welfare League.
 Leyden Josephine Tingey – superintendent of the Dunedin Hospital district nursing service.
 Herbert Frederick Wood  – a prominent singer of Wellington. For services to the community.

Military division
 Senior Commissioned Mechanician William Robert Paul – Royal New Zealand Navy.
 Lieutenant-Commander (S) Thomas Ronald Roydhouse – Royal New Zealand Naval Volunteer Reserve.
 Major Geoffrey Lawrence Falck  – New Zealand Territorial Force.
 Warrant Officer First Class Benjamin Keith Gilmer – Royal New Zealand Artillery.
 Major (temporary) Frank Rennie – New Zealand Regiment.
 Flight Lieutenant William Robert Duncan – Royal New Zealand Air Force.
 Warrant Officer Cedric Rex Carter – Royal New Zealand Air Force.

British Empire Medal (BEM)
Civil division
 Alice Hollis – caretaker, Government House, Wellington.
 Charles Stanley Yates – fuel officer in charge, Naval Dockyard, Auckland.

Military division
 Chief Petty Officer Charles Ivan Francis Brewis – Royal New Zealand Navy.
 Chief Petty Officer George Gerald Dessurne – Royal New Zealand Navy.
 Chief Petty Officer Donald Edgar George Nichols – Royal New Zealand Naval Volunteer Reserve.
 Lance-Corporal John Samuel Moyle – Royal New Zealand Electrical and Mechanical Engineers.
 Flight Sergeant Victor James Braggins – Royal New Zealand Air Force.
 Sergeant Gerald Mason Batchelor – Royal New Zealand Air Force.

Royal Red Cross

Associate (ARRC)
 Matron (temporary) Rachel Mary Simpson – Royal New Zealand Nursing Corps.
 Matron Lucille Emily Souness – Royal New Zealand Nursing Corps.

Air Force Cross (AFC)
 Squadron Leader John Ronald Day  – Royal New Zealand Air Force.
 Squadron Leader Robert Duncan McVicker – Royal New Zealand Air Force.
 Squadron Leader Cyril Laurence Siegert  – Royal New Zealand Air Force.

Queen's Commendation for Valuable Service in the Air
 Flight Lieutenant Keith Cecil Noble-Campbell – Royal New Zealand Air Force.

References

New Year Honours
1954 awards
1954 in New Zealand
New Zealand awards